A Picture of Me (Without You) is an album by American country music singer George Jones. It was released in 1972 on the Epic Records label.

Jones's second solo recording on Epic is one of five albums released by the singer in 1972 (three of his own and two duet albums with his wife Tammy Wynette) as producer Billy Sherrill wasted no time in flooding the market with new recordings by "the Possum". Jones's first album, George Jones (We Can Make It), made it to number 10 on the country albums charts but his second effort did better, rising to number three and featuring songs with a wider range of themes than those found on his Epic debut, which celebrated the happiness of new love. The album's title track was the only single release from it, peaking at #5 on the Billboard country singles charts.

In addition to love ballads, A Picture of Me (Without You) also includes songs more in line with Jones's reputation as country music's greatest interpreter of heartache, like the bitter "On The Back Row" and the Ernest Tubb classic "Tomorrow Never Comes" (which Elvis Presley had recorded the year before). The collection also contains Tom T. Hall's "Second Handed Flowers", the kind of "story song" that had always been a part of Jones's repertoire. After a shaky start, Jones and Sherrill sound more comfortable with each other's formidable reputation as they get to know each other musically. Their creative partnership would often be a compromise between the producer's sonic experimentation and the singer's hardcore country instincts. Biographer Bob Allen quotes the singer in his book George Jones: The Life and Times of a Honky Tonk Legend:  "I've got too much respect for country music to abuse it. I don't want a thousand violins and twenty trumpets on my records."

Lorrie Morgan covered "A Picture of Me (Without You)" on her 1991 album Something in Red and had a #8 country hit with it that same year.

Reception
Mark Beming of AllMusic writes of the album: "...while Sherrill's fondness for glossy surfaces wouldn't immediately seem compatible with Jones' hard honky tonk soul, he managed to give these sessions a low-key, late-night feel that was a fine match for the bluesy tone of Jones' voice...If you want to know why Gram Parsons called Jones 'the king of broken hearts,' one spin of this album will tell you all you need to know."

Track listing 
 "A Picture of Me (Without You)" (Norro Wilson, George Richey)
 "Man Worth Lovin' You" (Earl Montgomery)
 "She Knows What She's Crying About" (John Riggs)
 "Second Handed Flowers" (Tom T. Hall)
 "That Singing Friend of Mine" (Curly Putman)
 "She Loves Me (Right Out of My Mind)" (Freddy Weller, Spooner Oldham)
 "Tomorrow Never Comes" (Ernest Tubb, Johnny Bond)
 "Another Way to Say Goodbye" (Jean Chapel)
 "On the Back Row" (Jerry Chesnut, Norro Wilson)
 "Let There Be a Woman" (Jacqueline Wellman)
 "We Found a Match" (Earl Montgomery)

References

1972 albums
George Jones albums
Epic Records albums
Albums produced by Billy Sherrill